Kuvshinovo is the name of several inhabited localities in Russia.

Urban localities
Kuvshinovo, Kuvshinovsky District, Tver Oblast, a town of district significance in Kuvshinovsky District of Tver Oblast

Rural localities
Kuvshinovo, Bryansk Oblast, a village in Dmitrovsky Selsoviet of Pochepsky District of Bryansk Oblast
Kuvshinovo, Yukhnovsky District, Kaluga Oblast, a village in Yukhnovsky District, Kaluga Oblast
Kuvshinovo, Zhukovsky District, Kaluga Oblast, a village in Zhukovsky District, Kaluga Oblast
Kuvshinovo, Kostroma Oblast, a village in Chukhlomskoye Settlement of Chukhlomsky District of Kostroma Oblast
Kuvshinovo, Leningrad Oblast, a village in Pashskoye Settlement Municipal Formation of Volkhovsky District of Leningrad Oblast
Kuvshinovo, Moscow Oblast, a village in Karinskoye Rural Settlement of Zaraysky District of Moscow Oblast
Kuvshinovo, Smolensk Oblast, a village in Divasovskoye Rural Settlement of Smolensky District of Smolensk Oblast
Kuvshinovo, Kalininsky District, Tver Oblast, a village in Mikhaylovskoye Rural Settlement of Kalininsky District of Tver Oblast
Kuvshinovo, Rzhevsky District, Tver Oblast, a village in Chertolino Rural Settlement of Rzhevsky District of Tver Oblast
Kuvshinovo, Sokolsky District, Vologda Oblast, a village in Chuchkovsky Selsoviet of Sokolsky District of Vologda Oblast
Kuvshinovo, Vologodsky District, Vologda Oblast, a settlement in Semenkovsky Selsoviet of Vologodsky District of Vologda Oblast
Kuvshinovo, Yaroslavl Oblast, a village in Rozhdestvensky Rural Okrug of Myshkinsky District of Yaroslavl Oblast